Fornes or Fornés is a surname. Notable people with the surname include: 

Abraham Fornés (born 1939), Puerto Rican long-distance runner
Buddy Fornes (1931–1983), American football player 
Charles V. Fornes, American politician
Luis Barahona Fornés, Chilean politician
María Irene Fornés (1930–2018), Cuban-American playwright and director
Miguel Ángel Fornés (born 1993), Spanish volleyball player
Óscar Fornés (born 1983), Spanish footballer 
Paula Montal Fornés (1799–1889), Spanish Catholic nun
Sverre Fornes (1932–2021), Norwegian football player